Enn Mikker (alternatively referred to as Vormsi Enn; 5 August 1943 – 17 May 2020), was a prominent
Estonian esoteric practitioner, sometimes introduced as a "witch" or a "miracle healer".

References 

Estonian esotericists
1943 births
2020 deaths